A near-Earth supernova is an explosion resulting from the  death of a star that occurs close enough to the Earth (roughly less than 10 to 300 parsecs (30 to 1000 light-years) away) to have noticeable effects on Earth's biosphere.

An estimated 20 supernova explosions have happened within 300 pc of the Earth over the last 11 million years. Type II supernova explosions are expected to occur in active star-forming regions, with 12 such OB associations being located within 650 pc of the Earth. At present, there are six near-Earth supernova candidates within 300 pc.

Effects on Earth
On average, a supernova explosion occurs within  of the Earth every 240 million years. Gamma rays are responsible for most of the adverse effects that a supernova can have on a living terrestrial planet. In Earth's case, gamma rays induce radiolysis of diatomic N2 and O2 in the upper atmosphere, converting molecular nitrogen and oxygen into nitrogen oxides, depleting the ozone layer enough to expose the surface to harmful solar and cosmic radiation (mainly ultra-violet). Phytoplankton and reef communities would be particularly affected, which could severely deplete the base of the marine food chain.

Odenwald discusses the possible effects of a Betelgeuse supernova on the Earth and on human space travel, especially the effects of the stream of charged particles that would reach the Earth about 100,000 years later than the initial light and other electromagnetic radiation produced by the explosion.

Risk by supernova type
{| class="wikitable" style="float: right; margin: 0.5em; text-align: center"
|+Candidates within 300 pc
|-
! Star designation
! Distance(pc)
! Mass()
|-
|style="text-align: left;"| IK Pegasi
| 46
| 1.65/1.15
|-
|style="text-align: left;"| Spica
| 80
| 10.25/7.0
|-
|style="text-align: left;"| Alpha Lupi
| 141
| 10.1
|-
|style="text-align: left;"| Antares
| 169
| 12.4/10
|-
|style="text-align: left;"| Betelgeuse
| 197
| 7.7–20
|-
|style="text-align: left;"| Rigel
| 264
| 18
|}

Speculation as to the effects of a nearby supernova on Earth often focuses on large stars as Type II supernova candidates. Several prominent stars within a few hundred light years of the Sun are candidates for becoming supernovae in as little as 1,000 years. Although they would be extremely visible, if these "predictable" supernovae were to occur, they are thought to pose little threat to Earth.

It is estimated that a Type II supernova closer than eight parsecs (26 light-years) would destroy more than half of the Earth's ozone layer. Such estimates are based on atmospheric modeling and the measured radiation flux from SN 1987A, a Type II supernova in the Large Magellanic Cloud. Estimates of the rate of supernova occurrence within 10 parsecs of the Earth vary from 0.05–0.5 per billion years to 10 per billion years. Several studies assume that supernovae are concentrated in the spiral arms of the galaxy, and that supernova explosions near the Sun usually occur during the approximately 10 million years that the Sun takes to pass through one of these regions. Examples of relatively near supernovae are the Vela Supernova Remnant ( ly,  years ago) and Geminga ( ly,  years ago).

Type Ia supernovae are thought to be potentially the most dangerous if they occur close enough to the Earth. Because Type Ia supernovae arise from dim, common white dwarf stars, it is likely that a supernova that could affect the Earth will occur unpredictably and take place in a star system that is not well studied. The closest known candidate is IK Pegasi. It is currently estimated, however, that by the time it could become a threat, its velocity in relation to the Solar System would have carried IK Pegasi to a safe distance.

Past events
Evidence from daughter products of short-lived radioactive isotopes shows that a nearby supernova helped determine the composition of the Solar System 4.5 billion years ago, and may even have triggered the formation of this system. Supernova production of heavy elements over astronomic periods of time ultimately made the chemistry of life on Earth possible.

Past supernovae might be detectable on Earth in the form of metal isotope signatures in rock strata. Subsequently, iron-60 enrichment has been reported in deep-sea rock of the Pacific Ocean by researchers from the Technical University of Munich. Twenty-three atoms of this iron isotope were found in the top 2 cm of crust (this layer corresponds to times from 13.4 million years ago to the present). It is estimated that the supernova must have occurred in the last 5 million years or else it would have had to happen very close to the solar system to account for so much iron-60 still being here. A supernova occurring so close would have probably caused a mass extinction, which did not happen in that time frame. The quantity of iron seems to indicate that the supernova was less than 30 parsecs away. On the other hand, the authors estimate the frequency of supernovae at a distance less than D (for reasonably small D) as around (D/10 pc)3 per billion years, which gives a probability of only around 5% for a supernova within 30 pc in the last 5 million years. They point out that the probability may be higher because the Solar System is entering the Orion Arm of the Milky Way. In 2019, the group in Munich found interstellar dust in Antarctic surface snow not older than 20 years which they relate to the Local Interstellar Cloud. The detection of interstellar dust in Antarctica was done by the measurement of the radionuclides Fe-60 and Mn-53 by highly sensitive accelerator mass spectrometry, where Fe-60 is again the clear signature for a recent near-Earth supernova origin.

Gamma ray bursts from "dangerously close" supernova explosions occur two or more times per billion years, and this has been proposed as the cause of the end-Ordovician extinction, which resulted in the death of nearly 60% of the oceanic life on Earth.

In 1998 a supernova remnant, RX J0852.0-4622, was found in front (apparently) of the larger Vela Supernova Remnant. Gamma rays from the decay of titanium-44 (half-life about 60 years) were independently discovered emanating from it, showing that it must have exploded fairly recently (perhaps around the year 1200), but there is no historical record of it. Its distance is controversial, but some scientists argue from the flux of gamma rays and X-rays that the supernova remnant is only 200 parsecs (650–700 light-years) away. If so, its occurring 800 years ago is a statistically unexpected event because supernovae less than 200 parsecs away are estimated to occur less than once per 100,000 years.

See also
 List of supernova candidates

Footnotes

References

Supernova
Supernovae
Space hazards
Cosmic doomsday